Between the Breaks ... Live! is a 1979 folk music album by Stan Rogers. It was recorded at The Groaning Board in Toronto, Ontario.

The album was included in a series of reissued versions of Stan Rogers albums on Borealis Records. The Borealis releases were given completely new cover artwork.

Track listing
  The Witch of the Westmorland
 Written by Archie Fisher.
  Barrett's Privateers
  First Christmas
  The Mary Ellen Carter
  The White Collar Holler
 Written by Nigel Russell
  The Flowers of Bermuda
  Rolling Down to Old Maui
 Traditional sea chanty.
  Harris and the Mare
  Delivery Delayed

Personnel
Stan Rogers: six string and twelve string acoustic guitars, vocals.
Garnet Rogers: violin, flute, vocals.
David Alan Eadie: electric bass, pennywhistle, vocals.
Grit Laskin: long-necked mandolin, concertina, Northumbrian smallpipes, vocals.
Curly Boy Stubbs: acoustic guitar, vocals.

References

Stan Rogers albums
1979 live albums